The 1895 Miami Redskins football team was an American football team that represented Miami University during the 1895 college football season. In their first season with a head coach, they went undefeated with a 3–0 record. Their coach was C. K. Fauver.

Schedule

References

Miami
Miami RedHawks football seasons
College football undefeated seasons
Miami Redskins football